Wszechświęte may refer to the following places in Poland:
Wszechświęte, Lower Silesian Voivodeship (south-west Poland)
Wszechświęte, Świętokrzyskie Voivodeship (south-central Poland)